I. australis  may refer to:
 Ictalurus australis, the bagre del panuco, a fish species endemic to Mexico
 Ichthyococcus australis, the Southern lightfish, a fish species
 Icichthys australis, the southern driftfish or ragfish, a medusafish species found around the world in all southern oceans
 Indigofera australis, the Australian indigo, a leguminous shrub species

See also
 Australis (disambiguation)